The Valdivia International Film Festival (Spanish: Festival Internacional de Cine de Valdivia (FICV o FICVALDIVIA)) is an international film exhibition and competition, held annually in the city of Valdivia, Los Rios region, Chile.

The festival begun in 1993 to celebrate the 30th anniversary of the Cine Club of the Universidad Austral de Chile. A competition was included the following year, labeled as "Valdivia Cine & Video". That event became a milestone to cultural activity in southern Chile, promising at that time to become the greatest film event in the country. The early versions of the festival were oriented to ecological issues. From that point the characteristic trophy award emerged: the Pudú (The Pudú is a small kind of deer, typical of southern Chile). In 2001 the feature film competition category started, becoming the Festival into the most important film event in Chile.

Awards

I. - International Feature length Films:
- Best Feature Film
- Jury Special Award
- Jury Special Mention Award

II. - Chilean Feature Film:
- Best Feature Film
- Jury Special Award

III. - International Short Films:
-Best Short Film Award

IV. - Film Schools:
-Best Short Film Award

Categories
I. - Feature Length International Films: Chilean and Foreign films, at least 60 minutes long. Submissions are open to Fiction or Documentary. (Accepted formats are mentioned on item 7 d). Films in this category that have previously been screened in Chile under any circumstance are not admitted.

II. - Feature Length Chilean Films: Chilean Produced Films only, at least 60 minutes long. Submissions are open to Fiction or Documentary. (Accepted formats are mentioned on item 7 d). Films in this category that have previously been screened in Chile under any circumstance are not admitted.

The entry form is for both categories. Our team will decide which Chilean Films are selected for each competition.

III. - Latin American Short Films: Submissions are open to Fiction, Documentary, Experimental and/or Animation Short Films, in any format; films should be no more than 30 minutes in length including credits. Chilean and Latin American Films. (Accepted formats are mentioned on item 7 d)

IV. - Film Schools Short Film Competition: Submissions are open to Fiction, Documentary, Experimental and/or Animation Short Films, made by Audiovisual or Film Students (undergraduate or graduate students); Films may be in any format and should be no more than 30 minutes in length including credits. Films must be from a Chilean Institutions by Chilean or Latin American directors (See format information on item 7 d).

Feature Films participating in the International Official Selection and Chilean Official Selection spoken in a language other than English, must send a screening copy with English subtitles.

Short films in Spanish from the Latin American Short Film Selection, must submit a screening copy with English Subtitles. Short Films not spoken in Spanish must send a screening copy with Spanish subtitles.

See also
Santiago International Film Festival
Viña del Mar International Film Festival
Cinema of Chile

References

External links 
Valdivia International Film Festival official website .

Chilean film awards
Cultural festivals in Chile
Film festivals in Chile
Films shot in Chile
Austral University of Chile
1993 establishments in Chile
Valdivia
Spring (season) events in Chile